Ralph Francis Scalera (June 28, 1930 – January 27, 2011) was a United States district judge of the United States District Court for the Western District of Pennsylvania.

Education and career
Scalera was born in Midland, Pennsylvania and attended Midland High School. He received an Artium Baccalaureus degree from Harvard College in 1952 and a Bachelor of Laws from the University of Pennsylvania Law School in 1955. He was in the United States Army Counter Intelligence Corps from September 1955 to September 1957, after which time he went into private practice in Beaver, Pennsylvania from 1957 to 1959. Scalera later served as an Assistant United States Attorney of the Western District of Pennsylvania, from 1959 to 1961, and a judge of the Court of Common Pleas of Beaver County, from 1964 to 1970. He was the Presiding Judge of the Common Pleas Court from 1966 to 1970, before again returning to private practice. Scalera was the Republican Party nominee for Lieutenant Governor of Pennsylvania in 1970.

Federal judicial service

Scalera was nominated by President Richard Nixon on November 12, 1971, to a seat on the United States District Court for the Western District of Pennsylvania vacated by Judge John Lester Miller. He was confirmed by the United States Senate on November 23, 1971, and received his commission on November 30, 1971. His service terminated on May 1, 1976, due to his resignation.

Post judicial service
After his resignation, Scalera returned to private practice in Pittsburgh. He died on January 27, 2011, in Beaver.

References

Sources

1930 births
2011 deaths
20th-century American judges
People from Beaver, Pennsylvania
Harvard College alumni
University of Pennsylvania Law School alumni
Judges of the Pennsylvania Courts of Common Pleas
Judges of the United States District Court for the Western District of Pennsylvania
Pennsylvania lawyers
Pennsylvania Republicans
United States district court judges appointed by Richard Nixon
United States Army personnel
American people of Italian descent
Assistant United States Attorneys